Elizabeth A. I. Powell (born 1965 in New York, New York) is an American poet and professor. She is the author of three books of poetry, Atomizer, Willy Loman's Reckless Daughter: Living Truthfully Under Imaginary Circumstances and The Republic of Self. She is the author of the novel "Concerning the Holy Ghost's Interpretation of JCREW Catalogues". In addition, Powell is the granddaughter of Donald H. Miller, Jr. a founder of Scientific American and a Director of the Bulletin of the Atomic Scientists.

Life 
She is professor of Writing and Literature at Northern Vermont University, where she is Editor-in-Chief of Green Mountains Review, and is also a member of the MFA faculty at the University of Nebraska, Omaha.

Literary journals that have published her work include "The New Republic", "The Women's Review of Books", American Poetry Review, Missouri Review, Ploughshares, and Seneca Review, among others. Her poetry has received critical attention in "The Boston Globe", "The New Yorker",The San Francisco Chronicle, The Washington Independent Review of Books, Best American Poetry Blog, The Florida Review, Poetry Northwest, and on Vermont Public Radio, among others. Willy Loman's Reckless Daughter: Living Truthfully Under Imaginary Circumstances, which is built on the premise of Willy Loman having an illegitimate daughter, was listed under "Books We Loved" in 2016 in The New Yorker, calling it "a daring hybrid collection that deftly melds lineated verse, agile prose, and striking monologues". Another reviewer called it "fearlessly confessional" and noted that her poetry "pushes form in unexpected ways"; Grace Cavalieri wrote in the Washington Independent Review of Books that every piece was "a delight in style".

Her work has been anthologized in The Pushcart Prize XXXVII (2013) and The Word Exchange: Anglo-Saxon Poems in Translation (W. W. Norton & Company, 2010).

Honors and awards 
Her honors include the Pushcart Prize, the New Issues First Book Prize for Republic of Self, and the Robert Dana Prize for Willy Loman's Reckless Daughter.

Poetry collections 
 Atomizer. Louisiana State University Press.  Willy Loman's Reckless Daughter. 
 Republic of Self''.

References

External links 

 http://blog.pshares.org/index.php/living-imaginarily-under-truthful-circumstances-an-interview-with-elizabeth-powell/
 http://elizabethaipowell.com/

Living people
Writers from New York City
American women poets
University of Wisconsin–Madison alumni
21st-century American women writers
1965 births